The 2014 FIBA Europe Under-16 Championship Division C was the 10th edition of the Division C of the FIBA U16 European Championship, the third tier of the European men's under-16 basketball championship. It was played in Valletta, Malta, from 30 June to 5 July 2014. The host team, Malta, won the tournament.

Participating teams

Final standings

Results

References

FIBA U16 European Championship Division C
2014–15 in European basketball
FIBA U16
International basketball competitions hosted by Malta
June 2014 sports events in Europe
July 2014 sports events in Europe